Dienolone (developmental code name RU-3118; online product names Trenazone, Dienazone), or nordienolone, also known as 19-nor-δ9(10)-testosterone, δ9(10)-nandrolone, or estra-4,9(10)-dien-17β-ol-3-one, is a synthetic anabolic-androgenic steroid (AAS) of the 19-nortestosterone group that was never marketed. It has been found to possess slightly lower affinity for the androgen receptor (AR) and progesterone receptor (PR) relative to nandrolone in rat and rabbit tissue bioassays, whereas trenbolone was found to possess the same affinity for the AR as dienolone but several-fold increased affinity for the PR. Dienedione (the 17-keto analogue of dienolone, also known as 19-nor-4,9-androstadienedione) is thought to be a prohormone of dienolone, while methyldienolone and ethyldienolone are orally active 17α-alkylated AAS derivatives of dienolone. In contrast, dienogest, the 17α-cyanomethyl derivative of dienolone, is a potent progestogen and antiandrogen.

See also
 Trenbolone (trienolone)

References

Androgens and anabolic steroids
Conjugated dienes
Estranes
Enones
Progestogens